Cyrtodactylus spelaeus is a species of gecko that is endemic to Laos.

References

Cyrtodactylus
Reptiles described in 2014